Heridas de amor (English: Wounds of Love) is a Mexican telenovela produced by Roberto Hernández Vázquez for Televisa. It is a remake of the telenovela Valeria y Maximiliano. It premiered on April 3, 2006 and ended on September 22, 2006.

The telenovela stars Guy Ecker, Jacqueline Bracamontes, Sergio Sendel, Diana Bracho, Enrique Lizalde and Nuria Bages.

Plot
Miranda San Llorente is a young woman who has everything she wants in her life. Despite having everything, her devious siblings and her evil aunt, Bertha de Aragon are turning her life into living hell on a daily basis. After facing a huge disappointment in love, she is heartbroken. Suddenly, a man called Alejandro Luque enters her life and she starts to develop feelings for him. They will have to face many obstacles, twisted lies and secrets from past in order to live happily...  .

Cast

Main
Guy Ecker as Alejandro Luque Buenaventura
Jacqueline Bracamontes as Miranda San Llorente de Aragón
Sergio Sendel as César Beltrán Campuzano
Diana Bracho as Bertha de Aragón
Enrique Lizalde as Gonzalo San Llorente
Nuria Bages as Fernanda de Aragón de San Llorente

Recurring

Karla Álvarez as Florencia San Llorente de Aragón
Íngrid Martz as Renata San Llorente de Aragón
Grettell Valdéz as Pamela Altamirano Villamil
José Luis Reséndez as Fabricio Beltrán Campuzano
Ernesto D'Alessio as Juan Jiménez García
José Elías Moreno as Francisco Jiménez
Beatriz Moreno as Amparo Jiménez
Ricardo Blume as Leonardo Altamirano
Lourdes Munguía as Daira Lemans
Rosángela Balbó as Rebeca Campuzano Vda. de Beltrán
Jan as Luciano Sartori
Luis Couturier as Julio Bustamante
María Prado as Tomasa Aguirre
Héctor Sáez as Dr. Benjamín Cohen
Luis Xavier as Román Álvarez
Alicia del Lago as Natividad "Nati"
Carlos Pérez as Elías "Sansón" Mondragón
Frantz Cossío as Ángel Bustamante
Haydée Navarra as Carola Molinar
Karina Mora as Lizania Luque Lemans
Lina Durán as Andrea Villamil
Marcelo Córdoba as Daniel Bustamante
Pablo Bracho as Luis Alberto Campos
Paola Riquelme as Erika Duarte
Rodrigo Tejeda as Raúl Jiménez García
Rubén Morales as Vicente Mercado
Susy Lu as Verónica Ontiveros
Toño Mora as Joel Jiménez García
Vanessa Arias as Nuria Gómez
Susana González as Liliana López Reyna

Special performances
Leticia Calderón as Fernanda (young)
Juan Ferrara as Gonzalo (young)
Arturo Peniche as Alfredo Luque
Cecilia Gabriela as Bertha (young)

Awards and nominations

References

External links 

 at esmas.com 

2006 telenovelas
Mexican telenovelas
2006 Mexican television series debuts
2006 Mexican television series endings
Spanish-language telenovelas
Television shows set in Mexico City
Televisa telenovelas